Potravlje Fortress (also known as Potravnik or Travnik) is a medieval fortress near a village of Potravlje,  northwest of Sinj, Croatia.

The fortress was probably constructed by Nelipčić dukes, and was first mentioned in 1372. The Turks captured it in 1522, but were pushed out by the Venetians in the late 17th century.

Sources
 

Castles in Croatia
Buildings and structures in Split-Dalmatia County
14th-century establishments in Croatia